Liu Shilan (born January 24, 1962) is a Chinese  chess player who holds the title Woman Grandmaster, which she received in 1982 from FIDE. She has been the national women's champion of China seven times (1979–81, 1983-6).

Liu learned to play chess at 12 years old in a chess school in Chengdu, Sichuan. 
In 1982, Liu came third at the Women's Interzonal tournament in Tbilisi with a final score of 9 points out of 14. Thanks to this result, she became the first player from Asia to qualify for the Women's World Championship Candidates' matches and to achieve the title Woman Grandmaster (WGM).

At the Candidates' stage, Liu lost her quarterfinal match, held in 1983 in Velden, to Nana Ioseliani by 6-3 (+1, =4, -4). Later, she competed in two further Women's Interzonal tournaments (1985 Zeleznovodsk, finishing 14th with 4½/15; and 1987 Tuzla, finishing 10th with 8½/17.)

Liu competed for the Chinese national team at the Women's Chess Olympiad five times (1980–1988), with an overall record of 68 total games played (+25, =27, -16). She had the second best performance rating and won a bronze medal for first board at the 27th Chess Olympiad in Dubai, 1986.

See also
Chess in China

References

External links
 
 
 
 

1962 births
Living people
Chess woman grandmasters
Chinese female chess players
Chess players from Sichuan
Sportspeople from Chengdu
Chess Olympiad competitors
Place of birth missing (living people)